The Fleet Marine Force Combat Operation Insignia is a miniature  inch bronze United States Marine Corps emblem that may be authorized by the Secretary of the Navy for wear on specific campaign, expeditionary, and service medal ribbons issued to United States Navy sailors attached to and on duty with Fleet Marine Force (FMF) units during combat operations and sailors on duty with Navy units attached to and operating with Fleet Marine Force units while under Marine Corps operational control during combat operations. The device was instituted in 1953 with the Navy and Marine Corps Award Manual (NAVPERS 15,790, Revised 1953) dated 1953.

Criteria and wear 
The Fleet Marine Force Combat Operation Insignia (FMFCOI) must be authorized by the Marine Corps unit commander in order to be worn by U.S. Navy sailors such as hospital corpsmen, Religious program specialist, and chaplains assigned to Marine Corps units and Seabees assigned to naval units operating with Marine Corps units. The Marine Corps unit and sailor must have engaged in active combat action with an armed enemy during the sailor's service with the Marine Corps unit, or the sailor and the Navy unit must have engaged in active combat action with an armed enemy during the Navy unit's operating service with the Marine Corps unit. No more than one Marine Corps emblem may be worn on the ribbons.

The FMFCOI is positioned in the center of both the suspension ribbon and service ribbon of the medal. Any other authorized ribbon device such as the  inch service star or campaign star, are placed on either side of the FMF combat operation insignia, with the first star on the wearer's right of the insignia, the second star on the wearer's left of the insignia, and so on.

The FMFCOI is or was authorized to be worn on the following medals -

Currently awarded:
Armed Forces Expeditionary Medal
Global War on Terrorism Expeditionary Medal
Afghanistan Campaign Medal
Inherent Resolve Campaign Medal

Previously awarded:

Asiatic-Pacific Campaign Medal
European-African-Middle Eastern Campaign Medal
Korean Service Medal
Vietnam Service Medal
Southwest Asia Service Medal
Kosovo Campaign Medal
Iraq Campaign Medal

Notable recipients

Medal of Honor recipients

Navy chaplains

Vietnam War:
 Vincent R. Capodanno

Navy hospital corpsmen
World War II
 Robert Eugene Bush
 William D. Halyburton, Jr.
 Fred F. Lester
 Francis J. Pierce
 George E. Wahlen
 Jack Williams
John H. Willis

Korean War
 Edward C. Benfold
 William R. Charette
 Richard D. Dewert
 Francis C. Hammond
 John E. Kilmer

Vietnam War
 Donald E. Ballard
 Wayne M. Caron
 Robert R. Ingram
 David R. Ray

Global War on Terrorism
Luis Fonseca

See also
 Fleet Marine Force Insignia
 Hospital corpsman
 Seabees
 United States military award devices
 Awards and decorations of the United States military

References

Devices and accouterments of United States military awards
Seabees